Srite Glacier is a glacier over 20 nautical miles (37 km) long, flowing east and southeast from Janke Nunatak, Hauberg Mountains, to Orville Coast, Palmer Land, west of Spear Glacier. The feature was mapped by United States Geological Survey (USGS) from surveys and U.S. Navy aerial photographs in the period from 1961 to 1967, and was visited by a USGS geological party (1977–78), the party was led by Peter D. Rowley. the glacier was named by Advisory Committee on Antarctic Names (US-ACAN) after Commander (later Captain) David A. Srite, a U.S. Navy chief navigator of an LC-130 aircraft in support of the geological party in this area, (1977–78); Commanding Officer, Antarctic Development Squadron Six, 1979 to 1980; Commanding Officer, Naval Support Force, Antarctica, 1985 to 1987.

Glaciers of Palmer Land